Carol Rich (born Anne-Lyse Caille, 15 February 1962, Villorsonnens, Fribourg) is a Swiss singer, best known for her participation in the 1987 Eurovision Song Contest.  
 
After studying classical singing at the Conservatoire de Fribourg, Rich turned towards popular music and in 1984 made her first appearance in the Swiss Eurovision Song Contest selection, where her song "Tokyo Boy" could only manage seventh place, but was moderately successful when released as a single.

Rich returned in 1987, and this time was successful with "Moitié, moitié" ("Half and Half") being chosen as the Swiss entry for the 32nd Eurovision Song Contest, held on 9 April in Brussels. Although "Moitié, moitié" drew the coveted last spot in the performance order, the uptempo song did not prove memorable enough to win over the juries, finishing the evening in 17th place of the 22 entries. Rich entered her final Eurovision selection with "Donner la main" in 1991, finishing fourth.

In 1990, Rich moved to Paris, where she worked with Francis Lai and Roland Romanelli before taking a lengthy career break during which she gave birth to two children.  She returned to performing in 1999, now with a mixed repertoire of popular songs, traditional chansons and gospel music. In the 2000s, Rich continues to tour and has released three albums.

Albums discography 
1990: Longs les Jours
2000: Veux-tu vivre avec moi
2003: Adieu l'Armailli! (with Patrick Menoud)
2006: Si c'était à revivre

References

External links 
  (French)
 "Moitié, moitié" at diggiloo.net

1962 births
Living people
Eurovision Song Contest entrants of 1987
French-language singers of Switzerland
People from the canton of Fribourg
Eurovision Song Contest entrants for Switzerland
20th-century Swiss women singers
21st-century Swiss women singers